The Leinster GAA Hurling Minor Championship (known for sponsorship reasons as the Electric Ireland Leinster GAA Hurling Minor Championship, is an annual inter-county hurling competition organised by the Leinster Council of the Gaelic Athletic Association (GAA). It is the highest inter-county hurling competition for male players under the age of 17 in the province of Leinster, and has been contested every year – except for a three-year absence during the Emergency – since the 1928 championship.

The final, usually held on the last Sunday in June, serves as the culmination of a series of games played during April, May and June, and the results determine which team receives the Hanrahan Cup. The championship was previously played on a straight knockout basis whereby once a team lost they were eliminated from the championship, however, the championship has since incorporated a round-robin system.

The Leinster Championship is an integral part of the wider GAA Hurling All-Ireland Minor Championship. The winners of the Leinster final, like their counterparts in the Munster Championship, are rewarded by advancing directly to the semi-final stage of the All-Ireland series of games. The losers of the Leinster final enter the All-Ireland series at the quarter-final group stage.

11 teams currently participate in the Leinster Championship.

Trophy

At the end of the Leinster final, the winning team is presented with a trophy. The Hanrahan Cup is named after Walter Hanrahan (Wexford), the first Secretary of the Leinster Council.

General statistics

Performance by county

Biggest Leinster final wins

 The most one sided Leinster finals:
 29 points – 1974: Kilkenny 8-19 (43) – (14) 3-5 Dublin
 27 points – 1972: Kilkenny 7-10 (31) – (4) 0-4 Wexford
 26 points – 2006: Kilkenny 4-22 (34) – (8) 1-5 Carlow
 25 points – 1971: Kilkenny 7-18 (39) – (14) 3-5 Wexford
 25 points – 1946: Dublin 7-5 (26) – (1) 0-1 Laois
 25 points – 1935: Kilkenny 7-8 (29) – (4) 1-1 Laois

Miscellaneous

 Kilkenny hold the record for the longest streak of success. For ten championship seasons between 1990 and 1999 the county failed to lose a game and won ten Leinster titles in-a-row.
 Kilkenny hold the record for the most consecutive appearances in Leinster finals. They played in twelve in a row between 1968 and 1979, with success coming on ten of those occasions.
 Four counties have completed the minor and senior double in the same year:
Kilkenny in 1931, 1932, 1933, 1935, 1936, 1937, 1939, 1950, 1957, 1958, 1959, 1969, 1971, 1972, 1973, 1974, 1975, 1978, 1979, 1982, 1991, 1992, 1993, 1998, 1999, 2001, 2002, 2003, 2006, 2008, 2009, 2010, 2014, 2015, 2020, 2021
Dublin in 1928, 1938, 1952
Wexford in 1968, 1970, 2019
Offaly in 1989

List of Leinster Finals

Kilkenny were disqualified from the championship due to their registration not being in order.
Laois were awarded the title following an objection.

Records and statistics

By decade 

The most successful team of each decade, judged by number of Leinster Minor Hurling Championship titles, is as follows:

1930s: 8 for Kilkenny (1930-31-32-33-35-36-37-39)
1940s: 3 each for Kilkenny (1942-48-49) and Dublin (1945-46-47)
1950s: 7 for Kilkenny (1950-51-55-56-57-58-59)
1960s: 4 each for Kilkenny (1960-61-62-69) and Wexford (1963-66-67-68)
1970s: 9 for Kilkenny (1971-72-73-74-75-76-77-78-79)
1980s: 4 for Kilkenny (1981-82-84-88)
1990s: 10 for Kilkenny (1990-91-92-93-94-95-96-97-98-99)
2000s: 7 for Kilkenny (2001-02-03-04-06-08-09)
2010s: 5 for Kilkenny ( 2010-13-14-15-17)

Top scorers

Overall

Finals

References

External links
 All-time roll of honour
 2012 Leinster Minor Hurling Championship fixtures
 Complete Roll of Honour on Kilkenny GAA bible

 11